Colm Burke (born 17 January 1957) is an Irish Fine Gael politician who has been a Teachta Dála (TD) for the Cork North-Central since the 2020 general election. He previously served as a Senator for the Industrial and Commercial Panel from 2011 to 2020, Member of the European Parliament (MEP) for the South constituency from 2007 to 2009 and Lord Mayor of Cork from 2003 to 2004.

He was a member of the European Parliament for the South constituency in Ireland between 2007 and 2009. He was appointed in June 2007, following the re-election of the outgoing MEP Simon Coveney to Dáil Éireann. Following the abolition of the dual mandate, Coveney opted to remain in national politics and resigned from the European Parliament. Burke subsequently sat as a Fine Gael and European People's Party MEP. He served on various European Parliament committees including Committee on Foreign Affairs, Internal Market & Consumer Protection (Substitute), Committee on Fisheries (Substitute Member) and Subcommittee on Human Rights (Substitute Member). Burke lost his seat at the 2009 European Parliament election, with Fine Gael party colleague Seán Kelly taking a seat instead.

Burke was a member of Cork City Council from 1999 to 2007 and served as Lord Mayor of Cork from 2003 to 2004. He was elected to Seanad Éireann in April 2011 and re-elected in 2016. He was the Fine Gael Seanad Spokesperson on Health.

He was an unsuccessful candidate at the 2019 Cork North-Central by-election. He was elected for the Cork North-Central constituency at the 2020 general election. During the campaign, the windows of his constituency office were smashed in and posters were taken.

References

External links
Colm Burke's page on the Fine Gael website

  

1957 births
Living people
Alumni of University College Cork
Fine Gael MEPs
Fine Gael senators
Irish solicitors
Local councillors in Cork (city)
Lord Mayors of Cork
MEPs for the Republic of Ireland 2004–2009
Members of the 24th Seanad
Members of the 25th Seanad
Members of the 33rd Dáil
Fine Gael TDs